Prentice is a village in Price County, Wisconsin, United States. The population was 660 at the 2010 census. The village is located within the Town of Prentice.

History
Prentice began as a lumber town, when Alexander Prentice of Portage formed the Jump River Lumber Company in 1882. The mill there sawed as much as 100,000 board feet of lumber a day until timber in the surrounding country dwindled in the 1890s.

After the sawmill closed, the United States Leather Company's local tannery ran until 1915, using local hemlock bark for its tanning process. And more and more farmers settled on the surrounding cut-over lands left by logging. Around 1903 a creamery in town began buying milk from them and selling butter.

Geography
Prentice is located at  (45.545499, -90.289413).

Demographics

2010 census
As of the census of 2010, there were 660 people, 293 households, and 180 families living in the village. The racial makeup of the village was 97.1% White, 0.9% African American, 0.9% Native American, and 1.1% from two or more races. Hispanic or Latino of any race were 1.1% of the population.

There were 293 households, of which 31.7% had children under the age of 18 living with them, 42.0% were married couples living together, 14.3% had a female householder with no husband present, 5.1% had a male householder with no wife present, and 38.6% were non-families. 33.8% of all households were made up of individuals, and 14.7% had someone living alone who was 65 years of age or older. The average household size was 2.25 and the average family size was 2.87.

The median age in the village was 39.4 years. 25.6% of residents were under the age of 18; 7.5% were between the ages of 18 and 24; 22.3% were from 25 to 44; 27.9% were from 45 to 64; and 16.8% were 65 years of age or older. The gender makeup of the village was 45.8% male and 54.2% female.

2000 census
As of the census of 2000, there were 626 people, 285 households, and 167 families living in the village. The population density was 312.8 people per square mile (120.8/km2). There were 316 housing units at an average density of 157.9 per square mile (61.0/km2). The racial makeup of the village was 97.28% White, 0.48% Black or African American, 1.12% Native American, 0.00% Asian, 0.00% Pacific Islander, 0.48% from other races, and 0.64% from two or more races. 2.08% of the population were Hispanic or Latino of any race.

There were 285 households, out of which 29.8% had children under the age of 18 living with them, 45.6% were married couples living together, 8.8% had a female householder with no husband present, and 41.4% were non-families. 35.8% of all households were made up of individuals, and 19.3% had someone living alone who was 65 years of age or older. The average household size was 2.20 and the average family size was 2.91.

In the village, the population was spread out, with 25.2% under the age of 18, 6.2% from 18 to 24, 27.3% from 25 to 44, 23.6% from 45 to 64, and 17.6% who were 65 years of age or older. The median age was 39 years. For every 100 females, there were 98.7 males. For every 100 females age 18 and over, there were 85.7 males.

The median income for a household in the village was $26,563, and the median income for a family was $46,406. Males had a median income of $31,944 versus $23,750 for females. The per capita income for the village was $16,216. 16.4% of the population and 13.5% of families were below the poverty line. 25.9% of those under the age of 18 and 10.7% of those 65 and older were living below the poverty line.

Transportation
Prentice is served by the Prentice Airport (5N2). Located one mile east of the village, the airport handles approximately 1,500 operations per year, with roughly 99% general aviation and 1% air taxi. The airport has a 3,250 foot asphalt runway (Runway 9-27).

Notable natives
 Albin C. Bro, President of Shimer College
 Donal Hord, sculptor
 Dennis Morgan, actor and tenor
 Leo Heikkinen, entrepreneur
 Oscar V. Peterson, Medal of Honor

See also
 List of villages in Wisconsin
 Pine Line Trail

References

External links

 
 Sanborn fire insurance maps: 1906 1919

Villages in Wisconsin
Villages in Price County, Wisconsin